Peter Costigan (21 June 1935 – 5 August 2002) was an Australian journalist and Lord Mayor of Melbourne from 1999 to 2001. In 1999, Costigan was elected a Councillor of the City of Melbourne and subsequently elected Lord Mayor by fellow Councillors, defeating rival Councillor John So with a majority of 5-to-4 votes.

Costigan grew up in Preston, a suburb of Melbourne and was educated by the Jesuits at St Patricks College, East Melbourne. He completed his tertiary education at the University of Melbourne.

Costigan was the younger brother of the twins Michael and Frank Costigan.

References

1935 births
2002 deaths
Journalists from Melbourne
Mayors and Lord Mayors of Melbourne
20th-century Australian politicians
Australian people of Irish descent
People from Preston, Victoria
University of Melbourne alumni